American Legion Hut is a historic clubhouse located at Hampton, Hampton County, South Carolina. It was built in 1933, and is a one-story, T-shaped cypress log building with a truss roof. The Hut was constructed as, and continues to be a meeting hall for the Hampton American Legion Post 108 as well as serving as a site for civic and social events. Local workers built the Hut supported by funds from the Reconstruction Finance Corporation during the Great Depression.

It was listed on the National Register of Historic Places in 2000.

References

Clubhouses on the National Register of Historic Places in South Carolina
Buildings and structures completed in 1933
National Register of Historic Places in Hampton County, South Carolina
Buildings and structures in Hampton County, South Carolina
Huts
American Legion buildings